George Frederick Pentecost (1842–1920) was a prominent American evangelist and co-worker with Revivalist D.L. Moody.

Biography 
He was born September 23, 1842, in Albion, Illinois, to Hugh Lockett and Emma Flower Pentecost, who was the daughter of Albion's founder George Flower (1788–1862). George's brother, Hugh O. Pentecost, was also a minister and activist.

Pentecost responded to Hindu criticism of slums, saying "Some of the brahmans of India have dared to make an attack upon Christianity. They take the slums of New York and Chicago and ask us why we do not cure ourselves. They take what is outside the pale of Christianity and judge Christianity by it."

Pentecost spoke against the behavior of westerners in Asian countries.

Pentecost spoke out against western imperialism in Asian countries and asserted that the actions of western nations did not come from Christianity.

He died August 7, 1920, in New York while travelling to preach. He had pastored Congregational, Baptist and Presbyterian Churches, latterly Bethany Presbyterian Church, Philadelphia.

See also 
 Religious views on smoking § Christianity

References 

 George F Pentecost DD: A Biographical Sketch with Bible Readings and Experiences with Inquirers. London: Hodder & Stoughton, 1882.

American evangelists
1920 deaths
1842 births
People from Albion, Illinois